Dicopomorpha echmepterygis is the smallest known insect and a species of parasitoid wasp in the family Mymaridae, which exhibits strong sexual dimorphism. The males are blind, apterous, and their body length is only 40% that of females.  With a body length averaging 186 μm (for 8 specimens measured, which ranged from 139 to 240 μm), males of D. echmepterygis have the shortest body length of all known insects (smaller than certain species of Paramecium, amoeba, and shorter than certain bacteria, Thiomargarita magnifica, all of which are single-celled organisms). The measured body length of a female was 550 μm. Dicopomorpha echmepterygis have relatively long legs and are dull grayish brown. They have small heads that lack compound eyes, with unsegmented antennae. Females, on the other hand, have entirely black bodies with dusky brown legs and antennae. The antennae are twice as long as they are wide compared to males. Compared to males, females have slender wings that are slightly narrowed through the middle. The eggs and larvae of this parasitoid are considerably smaller than the adult.

This species, described from Illinois, United States, is an idiobiont parasitoid of the eggs of a lepidopsocid barklouse, Echmepteryx hageni. Of five host eggs dissected, four contained one male and one female, the fifth one contained three males and one female. Adult males appear to mate with their sisters inside the host egg and die without ever leaving the egg. Similar life histories can be found with other species of Chalcidoidea, such as the trichogrammatid Prestwichia aquatica, which also mates within the host egg, fig wasps in the family Agaonidae, which exhibit similar sexual dimorphism and mate within the host fig, as well as in mites in the family Acarophenacidae (e.g. Adactylidium), which mate inside the body of their mother before they are born.

See also
 Kikiki - The smallest known flying insect

References

Mymaridae
Insects described in 1997

https://animaldiversity.org/accounts/Dicopomorpha_echmepterygis/